Serhiy Sibiryakov; Sergey Sibiryakov; (born 1 January 1982 in Stryi, Ukrainian SSR, Soviet Union) is a Ukrainian-born Russian football midfielder for Bukovyna Chernivtsi in the Ukrainian First League.

After the annexation of Crimea to Russia adopted Russian citizenship. In February 2015, he became a player TSK Simferopol, which acts in the Crimea championship.

External links
Profile on Obolon Kyiv official website 
 

1982 births
Living people
People from Stryi
Ukrainian footballers
Ukrainian Premier League players
FC Dnipro players
FC Zorya Luhansk players
FC Metalist Kharkiv players
FC Arsenal Kharkiv players
SC Tavriya Simferopol players
FC Obolon-Brovar Kyiv players
FC Bukovyna Chernivtsi players
Naturalised citizens of Russia
Association football midfielders
Sportspeople from Lviv Oblast